María Macarena Gelman García (born 1 November 1976, in Montevideo) is an Uruguayan activist and politician.

Biography
Born in captivity to an Argentine mother, María Claudia García Irureta Goyena, her father was Marcelo Ariel Gelman Schuberoff, son of Argentine poet Juan Gelman. Her parents were kidnapped during the Argentine military junta, and María Claudia was moved to Uruguay under Operation Cóndor; while there, she was held at the clandestine detention center Centro de detención del Servicio de Información de Defensa, ultimately being moved to the Hospital Militar upon the birth of her baby.  

Macarena was placed for adoption to a Uruguayan family. Her biological parents were murdered. Her father's remains were found in Argentina in 1990; as of 2021, her mother's remains have not been located. 

Macarena studied at The Universidad de la República, first in the Faculty of Science, and later in the Faculty of Chemistry.

The search for Macarena 
On December 23, 1998, Juan Gelman published "An open letter to my grandchild" in the weekly newspaper Brecha. The text, written in 1995, detailed his feelings for his granddaughter, whom he had not yet found, along with the story of her parents. This letter was part of a long time public effort on Gelman's part to find his grandchild; this search gained notoriety in the exchange of open letters between Gelman and former Uruguayan president Julio María Sanguinetti. Gelman asked for the at the time President's help in the investigation, while Sanguinetti denied that the "stealing of babies" ever took place in Uruguay. Sanguinetti began then receiving letters from various people around the world, including renowned authors and several Nobel Prize winners. 

Under such public pressure, in 2000, Sanguinetti's successor, President Jorge Batlle ordered two parallel investigations, which arrived at the same conclusions reached by Gelman in an independent investigation. Thus, Macarena recovered her identity. 

After this discovery, Macarena changed her surnames to those of her biological parents (Gelman García). She pursued a career in social activism with a particular focus in human rights violations during the Dirty War, and the recovery of identity of those who suspect familial relation to disappeared people.

In March 2014, Gelman took the decision to take part in politics and endorsed the presidential candidacy of Constanza Moreira. At the same time, she declared her own candidacy to the Uruguayan Parliament for the Broad Front in the October elections.

References

External links

  

1976 births
Politicians from Montevideo
Uruguayan activists
Uruguayan Jews
Uruguayan people of Argentine descent
Uruguayan people of Basque descent
Uruguayan people of Ukrainian-Jewish descent
Jewish activists
Jewish Uruguayan politicians
Living people
21st-century Uruguayan women politicians
21st-century Uruguayan politicians
Children of people disappeared during Dirty War
University of the Republic (Uruguay) alumni
Jewish women activists